Anton Mikhaylovich Burenkov (born 25 April 1986) is a former Russian football midfielder.

Club career
He played in the Russian Football National League for FC Dynamo Bryansk in 2008.

External links
 
 Career summary by sportbox.ru
 

1986 births
Footballers from Moscow
Living people
Russian footballers
Association football midfielders
FC Saturn Ramenskoye players
PFC Krylia Sovetov Samara players
FC Dynamo Bryansk players
FC MVD Rossii Moscow players